Pseudomaro is a monotypic genus of sheet weavers containing the single species, Pseudomaro aenigmaticus. It was first described by J. Denis in 1966, and has only been found in Europe.

See also
 List of Linyphiidae species (I–P)

References

Linyphiidae
Monotypic Araneomorphae genera
Palearctic spiders